The 1986 South Australian National Football League season was the 107th season of the top-level Australian rules football competition in South Australia.

Ladder

1986 SANFL Finals

Week 4 (1986 SANFL Grand Final)

References 

SANFL
South Australian National Football League seasons